Moskovskij Komsomolets is a Moscow-based daily newspaper with a circulation approaching one million, covering general news. Founded in 1919, it is famed for its topical reporting on Russian politics and society.

History
The newspaper was first published by the Moscow Committee of the Komsomol on 11 December 1919 as Yuny Kommunar. Over the next years it changed its name several time, starting a few months after the first issue when it became the Yunosheskaya Pravda. In 1924, after Vladimir Lenin's death, it was renamed to Molodoy Leninets. It took its present-day name in September 1929.

Between 1931 and 1939, the paper ceased publication. It was revived in 1940, but not for long: World War II interrupted publishing again in August 1941. Publishing resumed only on 2 October 1945. Until 1990, it served as the organ of the Moscow Committee and the Moscow City Committee of the All-Union Leninist Young Communist League. In 1991, it was taken over by its editorial staff.

Editors-in-chief
Since 1983, Pavel Gusev serves as MK editor-in-chief.

Previous editors-in-chief include:
Aleksandr Subbotin (1951–1958)
Arkady Udaltsov (1968–1974)
Lev Gushchin (1977–1983)

Contents
The paper specialises in topical social and political material, economic surveys, city news, urban chronicles and diverse information.

ZD Awards

MK is also known as the host of Russia's oldest hit parade – the Zvukovaya Dorozhka. It was founded in autumn 1975 by Yu. V. Filonov.  Also called the ZD Awards, it features both Russian and international acts. Since 2003, it has been held in concert halls. It is considered one of the major Russian music awards.

Circulation
According to a poll conducted in May 2004 by the Levada Center, 9% of the Russians and 33% of the Moscovites who responded, read the paper "more or less regularly". For the year 2000 the poll reports 11% and 40%, respectively.

It has a printed circulation of between 700,000 and 930,000 copies.

See also

 Dmitry Kholodov – a journalist, killed in 1994
 Moskovskaya Komsomolka
 Moskovskaya Pravda
 Journalists (novel) – a book about journalists from MK

Notes

References

1919 establishments in Russia
Komsomol
Mass media in Moscow
Newspapers published in the Soviet Union
Publications established in 1919
Russian-language newspapers published in Russia